The 1942 Duke Blue Devils football team was an American football team that represented Duke University as a member of the Southern Conference during the 1942 college football season. In its first season under head coach Eddie Cameron, the team compiled a 5–4–1 record (3–1–1 against conference opponents) and outscored opponents by a total of 211 to 98.  Jim Smith was the team captain. The team played its home games at Duke Stadium in Durham, North Carolina.

Schedule

References

Duke
Duke Blue Devils football seasons
Duke Blue Devils football